Siouzana Melikian is a Ukrainian-Mexican actress of Armenian descent.

Biography
Melikian was born on 14 August 1986, into a family of circus performers in Donetsk, Ukrainian SSR, USSR. Before moving to Mexico with her family, she spent the first years of her life in Moscow, where she learned gymnastics and ballet.

Once in Mexico, Siouzana studied acting and appeared on several TV commercials. She got her first opportunity as an actress in Transit, a movie made by MTV Europe and her first starring role in El estudiante (2009).

She has performed in several Mexican films and TV series such as Capadocia. She also played a teacher in Atrevete a Soñar, a telenovela (2009).

Filmography

Films 
 Morgana (2012)
 El estudiante (2009)
 Cómo no te voy a querer (2008)
 Mexican Standoff (2008)
 La invención de Morel (2006)
 Transit (2005)
 A La Mala (2015)

TV series 
 Nueva Vida (2013)
 El Ánima (2011)
 Gritos de muerte y libertad (2010)
 Morir en martes (2010)
 Capadocia (2008)
 Tiempo final (2008)
   Josè Josè La Serie (2016)

Telenovelas 
 Atrévete a soñar (2009)

References

External links

Living people
Mexican film actresses
Mexican telenovela actresses
Mexican people of Armenian descent
Soviet emigrants to Mexico
1986 births
Mexican people of Ukrainian descent
 Ukrainian people of Armenian descent